The Divorcée  is a 1953 German musical film directed by George Jacoby and starring Marika Rökk, Johannes Heesters and Hans Nielsen. It was based on the operetta Die geschiedene Frau by Leo Fall and Victor Léon. It was shot at the Bavaria Studios in Munich. The film's sets were designed by the art director Robert Herlth.

Plot 
Lukas van Deesteldonck is not only president of the Dutch sleeping car company, but also extremely pedantic and sometimes choleric. His wife Gonda, a well-known revue star, has a completely different temperament. That is why there is always a crisis in the marriage.

On a train journey from Paris to Amsterdam, Gonda is offered a sleeper coupe by her stage partner Karel van Lyssewege after she couldn't get one herself. When Karel has said goodbye to his partner, the door of the compartment suddenly no longer opens due to a construction error, so that the two have to spend the night in the same room. Only when you arrive in Amsterdam can a locksmith fix the problem. Word of what happened spreads quickly and turns into a scandal. Lukas van Deesteldonck believes his wife cheated on him. There is a divorce. 

One day Gonda receives a visit from her father, who works as a missionary in Borneo. He couldn't get over it when he found out his daughter was divorced. So she gets Karel to play the role of the husband. The two get closer. Out of nowhere Gonda's ex also appears, who wants to win her back because he has since convinced himself that he has wronged her. But it doesn't take long before he realizes that his ex-wife is lost to him forever.  

When the pastor says goodbye to his daughter and her “husband” the next day to return to Borneo, he is very happy that the two young people are a happy married couple.

Main cast
 Marika Rökk as Gonda van der Loo
 Johannes Heesters as Karel
 Hans Nielsen as Lucas
 Hans Leibelt as Pastor
 Friedrich Domin as Gerichtsvorsitzender
 Trude Hesterberg as Schauspielerin
 Gusti Wolf as Adeline
 Peter W. Staub as Scrop
 Erich Fiedler as von der Rosen
 Anni Korin as Dinnie
 Ulrich Bettac as Theaterdirektor

References

External links

1953 films
West German films
1953 musical comedy films
German musical comedy films
Films directed by Georg Jacoby
1950s German-language films
Films set in the Netherlands
Rail transport films
Films about divorce
Operetta films
Films based on operettas
Remakes of German films
Sound film remakes of silent films
Gloria Film films
Cine-Allianz films
Films scored by Leo Fall
Films shot at Bavaria Studios
1950s German films